White sea urchin is a common name for several sea urchins and may refer to:

Tripneustes depressus, found in the Pacific Ocean
Tripneustes ventricosus, found in the Caribbean Sea